Donald Axelrod (January 15, 1916 – March 16, 1999) was Professor Emeritus and former chairman of the Department of Public Administration & Policy at the State University of New York, Albany (SUNYA). Axelrod also served as director of the Public Enterprise Project of the Rockefeller Institute of Government.

Axelrod authored several books, including Budgeting for Modern Government and Shadow Government: The Hidden World of Public Authorities. Axelrod was a member of the American Society of Public Administration.

Death
Axelrod died on March 16, 1999, at his home in Slingerlands, New York, after a long battle with cancer, aged 83.

References

External links
 SUNY Albany biodata on Axelrod
 Axelrod biodata
Dr Axelrod's writings

1916 births
1999 deaths
20th-century American educators
Deaths from cancer in New York (state)
People from Bethlehem, New York
University at Albany, SUNY faculty
Place of birth missing
Public administration scholars
American political scientists
20th-century political scientists